Brenda Walker (born 1957 in Grafton, New South Wales) is an Australian writer. She studied at the University of New England in Armidale and, after gaining a PhD in English (on the work of Samuel Beckett) at the Australian National University, she moved to Perth in 1984. She is now Winthrop Professor of English and Cultural Studies at the University of Western Australia. She has been a visiting fellow at Stanford University and The University of Virginia.

Brenda Walker is the sister of songwriter and musician Don Walker, and daughter of author Shirley Walker.

Awards
 2011: Nita Kibble Literary Award, winner for "Reading by Moonlight"
 2010: Victorian Premier's Awards, Nettie Palmer Prize for Non-Fiction, winner for "Reading by Moonlight"
 2010: Queensland Premier's Literary Awards, shortlisted for "Reading by Moonlight"
 2007: Asher Award, winner for The Wing of Night
 2006: Nita Kibble Literary Award, winner for The Wing of Night
 2006: Miles Franklin Award, shortlisted for The Wing of Night
 2006: New South Wales Premier's Literary Awards, Christina Stead Prize, shortlisted for The Wing of Night
 2006: Waverley Library Award for Literature, The Alex Buzo Shortlist Prize: winner for The Wing of Night
 2000: Victorian Premier's Literary Award, shortlisted for Poe's Cat
 2000: New South Wales Premier's Literary Awards, Christina Stead Prize, Shortlisted for "Poe's Cat"
 1990: T. A. G. Hungerford Award for an unpublished manuscript, winner for Crush

Bibliography

Novels

 Crush (1991)
 One More River (1993)
 Poe's Cat (1999)
 The Wing of Night (2005)

Memoir
 Reading by Moonlight: How Books Saved a Life (2010)

Edited

 The Writer's Reader: A Guide to Writing Fiction and Poetry (2002)

References

References
 

1957 births
Living people
People from New South Wales
Australian women novelists